Samaipata Airport  is a public use airport located  south of Samaipata in the Santa Cruz Department of Bolivia.

The airport is in the eastern foothills of the Bolivian Andes, and there is rising terrain in all quadrants.

See also

Transport in Bolivia
List of airports in Bolivia

References

External links 
OurAirports - Samaipata
Fallingrain - Samaipata Airport

Airports in Santa Cruz Department (Bolivia)